Trance Mission is the debut album of Trance Mission, released in 1993 through City of Tribes Records.

Track listing

Personnel 
Trance Mission
Beth Custer – alto clarinet, bass clarinet, horns, gong, percussion, voice
Stephen Kent – didgeridoo, horns, surdo, shaker, percussion, voice
John Loose – tar, bodhrán, tabla, sampler, kalimba, kanjira, Riq, percussion, voice
Kenneth Newby – suling, piri, khene, gong, sampler, horns, percussion
Production and additional personnel
Will Bernard – guitar on "Tunnels" and "Rig"
Oliver DiCicco – production, engineering
Randall Erkelens – design
Eda Maxym – voice on "Red Man" and "Icaro"
Charles Rose – cover art
Jai Uttal – gub-gubbi and khartal on "Folk Song", dutar on "Red Man"

References

External links 
 

1993 albums
Trance Mission albums